North Campus is a residential section of Cornell University's Ithaca, New York campus located north of Fall Creek. It primarily houses freshmen. North Campus offers programs which ease the transition into college life for incoming freshmen. The campus offers interactions with faculty and other programs designed to increase interaction among members of the freshman class. North Campus is part of Cornell's residential initiative.

History

20th century
From 1913 to 1970, the area north of Fall Creek held Cornell University's women-only dormitories. Risley (1913), Comstock (1925), Balch (1929), Dickson (1946) and Donlon (1961) were referred to as the "women's dorms." Visitation by men was so regimented that mobs of freshmen men would gather to storm the area in "panty raids" seeking undergarment mementos. During this period, women had limited opportunities to attend Ivy League schools, and the limited number of dorm rooms available to female freshmen students was used to calculate a female admission quota for each college. As a result, female applicants needed higher test scores and GPAs than male applicants to gain admission to Cornell. 

The original master plan for the area called for the pattern of Balch-type courtyards to be extended northward. Dickson was built consistent with the spirit of the plan. The construction of Donlon broke with the plan with a high-rise modern design. All of these buildings were designed for women and included self-contained dining facilities as well as parlors for receiving male visitors.

Fuertes Observatory, built on a knoll just to the north of Beebe Lake, was completed in the fall of 1917. The observatory is still used for introductory astronomy labs, as well as for public viewing nights on clear Fridays.

In 1940, the first 9 holes of Cornell's Robert Trent Jones Golf Course were built adjacent to the North Campus dormitories.

In 1963, Helen Newman Hall opened to serve as the women's gymnasium and housed the women's physical education program.

In 1970, a new set of red brick dormitories called "North Campus" opened, consisting of the Low Rise and High Rise complexes. The Robert Purcell Community Center, originally known as the North Campus Union, was also built and opened in 1971. Although three more Low Rise dorms (#2 to #4) were planned, funding was not available, and the area between High Rises 1 and 5 was left undeveloped. Also in 1970, Cornell started experimenting with coed dorms, and all buildings except Balch Hall (which is limited to housing women by a bequest) gradually became coed. With coeducation, the name of the entire area north of the creek became "North Campus."

In 1972, to compensate the Athletics Department for the loss of the Lower Alumni Fields to biology buildings, intramural playing fields were developed on North Campus.

The need for additional dorms became pressing, and the Trustees commissioned Richard Meier to design new dorm buildings which followed the contours of the fairways of the abandoned golf course site. Again, economics prevented this striking design from being built. The townhouses now occupy a portion of this site.

Just About Music, also known as JAM, is a musically-themed program house founded during the 1987-1988 academic year. JAM is located on North Campus and is in Low Rise 9. Consistent with the low-rise style, the building contains four units, each comprising six suites, each of which contain a bathroom and four rooms (a double, a triple and two singles).

JAM houses 144 undergraduate students, who call themselves "Jammies". There are four residential advisors, or RAs, who often plan programs for the residents. There is one Residence Hall Director (RHD) and many out-of-house members.

JAM is also home to three pianos, a practice room, and a drum set. The building contains a Performance Space, also called the "P-Space," complete with a sound system and stage lighting, which is used throughout the school term for concerts, programs, and rehearsals. The P-Space also doubles as a recording studio for those who wish to record their music, with a separate recording booth and drum room.

In the 1990s, JAM was housed in Class of 1926 Hall on West Campus and housed 200 undergraduate students.  This arrangement was superseded by the North Campus Initiative and the demolition of the University Halls.

The present programmatic layout of North Campus was initially proposed in 1997, by then-Cornell President Hunter R. Rawlings III. It was designed to promote the unification of the freshman living areas. North Campus was brought about to bring together Cornell's disjointed first-year programs. This North Campus Initiative, as the proposal was called, united the vision of Charles Dagit and Alan Chimacoff with the Hillier Group and Dagit-Saylor Associates chosen to implement the plan which led to the construction of Mews Hall, Court Hall, and Appel Commons. Both Mews and Court are considered to be temporary names, to be replaced by the names of donors.

21st century
On October 14, 2005, the southern wing of Court Hall was re-dedicated as Bauer Hall, marking the generosity of the Bauer family, and the B Wing of Court was renamed Kay, making the hall's full name Court-Kay-Bauer. Completed in 2002, Appel Commons became the second community center on North Campus. It contains North Star dining, Ezra's Emporium, a fitness center, and multipurpose rooms.

North Campus Residential Expansion (NCRE)
The North Campus Residential Expansion (NCRE), announced in 2018, added six buildings with about 2,000 beds and a dining hall to North Campus. The project is led by Trowbridge Wolf Michaels Landscape Architects. The five new residence halls are named for alumni Toni Morrison, M.A. ’55, Ruth Bader Ginsburg ’54, Barbara McClintock (B.S. 1923, M.A. 1925, Ph.D. 1927), Hu Shih (B.A. 1914), and to honor the Cayuga Nation ("Ganędagǫ").  Morrison and Ganędagǫ opened in fall 2021, and Shih, McClintock and Ginsburg opened in fall 2022.

Noyes Lodge

Noyes Lodge was originally built in 1958 as a dining hall. It contained the Pancake House and the Pick-Up, a small grocery, in the 1970s and ’80s. It also contained the Language Resource Center. In 2018, Noyes was completely renovated to be the home of the Tang Welcome Center, the first official welcome center at Cornell. The center, which overlooks Beebe Lake, contains space for exhibitions about the University's history and mission, and serves as a gathering point for visitors and the starting point for campus tours.

Traditional residences

Balch Hall

On North Campus, Balch Hall stands out for its English Renaissance style. Originally, each of the four halls were decorated differently in "Early American, Georgian, English Jacobean, and modern Gramercy Park". Balch Hall is the only all-female dormitory left on North Campus. The former dining hall has since been converted into a student center, cafe, and lecture hall for all first-year students known as the Carol Tatkon Center. The dorm rooms are unique in that each has its own working sink.

Court-Kay-Bauer Community

Court, Kay and Bauer Halls are joined by an enclosed bridge on the second and third floor and an open air walkway (weather permitting) on the fourth floor. The residence hall opened in the fall of 2001 as Court Hall; in the fall of 2005, the south section was renamed Bauer Hall to honor Robert and Virginia Bauer's donation to the university. In autumn 2006, the former B wing of the building was renamed Kay Hall, in honor of Cornell alumnus Bill Kay's donation. Court-Kay-Bauer houses 270 first-year students, 9 Resident Advisors, 1 Residence Hall Director and a Faculty in Residence.

Clara Dickson Hall

Clara Dickson Hall or just "Dickson" is a Georgian-style building located on North Campus, built in 1946. With a gross area of 168,791 sq ft (15,681 m²) and a net area of 139,899 sq ft (12,997 m²), it is the largest dormitory in the Ivy League. It houses 575 first-year students in a variety of singles, doubles, and triples. Clara Dickson Hall also is home to the Multicultural Living Learning Unit, one of Cornell's residential program houses. When Dickson was an all-female residence hall, it had a dining hall.

Mary Donlon Hall
Built in 1961, it houses 472 first-year students arranged in double rooms (with a few singles and two "quads," three room suites for four students, per floor), typically sized 12' x 18'. It has a unique triangular structure separated onto 6 floors. Facilities include a TV/social lounge, piano, laundry, elevator, kitchen, computer networking, study lounge, lofting furniture, and library. The study lounge located on the first floor is nicknamed 'The Morgue' due to its notoriously dim lighting, silence, and freezing temperatures for most of the year.

Low Rises
The Low Rise complex is composed of Low Rises 6, 7, 8, 9 and 10. Low Rise 6 and 7 operate as traditional suite style dormitories, whereas 8, 9 and 10 operate as Program Houses (Holland International Living Center, Just About Music, and Ujamaa respectively). The buildings were constructed in 1975. Low Rises 6 and 7 house 168 students  while Low Rises 8,9, and 10 house 144 students. Each Low Rise is composed of four units, each of which have 6 suites, a kitchen, an RA room (formerly a study lounge), and a unit lounge. Each suite is composed of a bathroom, two singles, a double and a triple (though the doubles are used as "forced" triples in Low Rises 6 and 7). Each building also has its own main lounge, with some having apartments for Faculty-in-Residence or RHDs and their families to stay.

High rises

George Jameson Hall and High Rise 5, completed in 1972, are two tall brick buildings on North Campus located at opposite sides of Robert Purcell Community Center. Each houses 225 freshmen, 5 Resident Advisors, a Faculty in Residence in Jameson, and an RHD in High Rise 5. There are 5 main living floors per building, although there are student rooms on the ground and lounge floors. The rooms are arranged in suite style, with 2 singles, and 2 doubles; or 2 singles, a double and a triple. Each of the five floors has 6 suites, a kitchen, and a common lounge, which can be converted into a quintuple in dire situations. On the top floors are Skylounges, which provide views of all of North Campus. The building is only accessible by elevators if a person wishes to go up because the stairs up are not accessible from the ground floor.

Townhouse Community
The Townhouse Community is a group of eight buildings supplying apartment-style living to approximately 300 freshmen. Originally graduate housing, they were opened to freshmen in the mid-1990s. The Townhouses are nearly all arranged in pairs of two doubles. This is unique in that just four students share a bathroom and shower, kitchen, living room, and dining room. The Townhouse Community Center, located between the buildings, provides community events, mailboxes, a study room, laundry machines, and lounges. The eight units are labeled A through H, and each pair sits at opposite sides of four grassy quads.

Mews Hall

The building is designed and named after Mews, a building style originating with British stables. The building is separated into two parallel halves, east and west, which are linked by a hallway and Lund study lounge. Between the wings is a large courtyard. The Western wing houses two floors of students as well the Residence Hall Director and the Faculty in Residence, while the Eastern wing houses three floors of students. Each floor has two study lounges and a shared TV lounge and kitchen. Mews Hall houses 279 first-year students arranged in suites of singles and doubles. The air-conditioned facilities include a TV/social lounge, piano, laundry, elevators, computer networking, bike storage room. Mews Hall is governed by a student elected Hall Council and Judicial Board and has a student committee known as the Community Outreach Group which is responsible for organizing community service programs. Mews Hall is well-known for its proximity to basketball and tennis courts, in addition to its lavish rooms (J units).

Risley Hall

Risley Residential College is a residential college for the creative and performing arts. Commonly known as Risley Hall, Risley Residential College, or just Risley, it is a themed residence hall at Cornell University. Unlike most other traditional dormitories on campus, Risley is a residential college, meaning that the house members, "Risleyites", are encouraged to eat together at the in-house dining hall, can live as house members for all four or five years they spend enrolled at Cornell, and participate in educational activities, such as guest lectures, within their dormitory.

The building houses 190 students who are admitted by applications that are reviewed by current Risleyites and two Guest Suite Artists ("GSA"), who live in the building and organize regular programs in which the house members participate. As a dormitory, Risley offers a unique living experience. The Tudor Gothic building itself is shaped like a large, red castle. When constructed, the architect, William Henry Miller, was requested to design the floor plan such that no two rooms would be identical. Consequently, the rooms vary greatly. Sizes range from a single room that is 93 square feet (9 m²), a former maid's room, to a double room that is 273 square feet (25 m²), the largest double on campus. Various room features include balconies, fireplaces, dumbwaiter shafts, secret stairwells, bay windows, embrasures, and turrets.

Multicultural Living Learning Unit
The Multicultural Living Learning Unit, was originally housed in the Class of '17 on West Campus. In 1999 McLLU was relocated to North Campus within Clara Dickson Hall. There are approximately 50 "McLLUies" - first year and upper level student residents. These students represent a global community of backgrounds and ethnic groups which are found at Cornell University. Its new North Campus location is ideal because it is near several convenient facilities including community centers, dining halls, convenience stores, recreational facility, gyms, and bus routes.

Ujamaa
Ujamaa, pronounced oo-ja-ma, houses 140 students, in a program house dedicated to allowing students to learn about the history and culture of black people in the United States, Africa, and the Caribbean.

Akwe:kon
Akwe:kon, pronounced a-gway'-go, Residential College is the first university residence of its kind in the country purposely built for the interests of American Indians.It was established in 1991, and means "all of us". The community has 35 residents and the building's landscape was set up with Native American symbolism and extensive input from Native Americans.

Latino Living Center
Founded in 1994, the Latino Living Center is located in Anna Comstock House on North Campus, across the street from Risley Residential College. Every year, the Latino Living Center houses 56 residents from all over the world. Residents are not exclusively students with Latino heritage, since one of the goals of the program house is to give other students the opportunity to immerse themselves in Latino culture.

The LLC has numerous programs during the year. Every year, student organizations and fraternities hold events in the house in order to promote student activism. The LLC's main program is its Cafe con Leche Series, in which student organizations make a presentation of cultural, educational or political relevance for the event.

Holland International Living Center

The Jerome H. Holland International Living Center houses 144 students from the United States and other countries who would like to interact with people from across the globe on a daily basis. There are debates, presentations and forums to help foster international understanding and communication. The residential hall is named after Cornell alumnus Jerome "Brud" Holland, class of 1939.

Ecology House

Ecology House: The Hurlburt Residential College for Environmental Education and Awareness, commonly called Eco House, houses 96 students. Of these 96, approximately 45% are upperclassmen; 45% are freshmen; and 10% are transfers. The building has a large kitchen, several common areas (For both quiet studying and socializing), laundry facilities, and a bike room in the basement.

The house has several committees and clubs. Steering Committee is the governing body of the house, meeting every Sunday to discuss house related business and vote on certain topics, and sponsors many events throughout the year, including Ice Cream Nights on Wednesdays, the Fall Formal, and the Spring Formal. Project Greenhouse is a Cornell-based club housed in Eco, which helps improve and maintain the self-built greenhouse in the backyard, while also sponsoring events related to plant sciences and awareness. They also run a composting program that every resident can easily participate in. Other committees include Eco Creates, an environmentally centered arts & crafts committee, Eco Adventures, which organizes outdoor excursions and indoor activities, and Eco Eats, which hosts baking competitions, themed house dinners, and the much beloved "David Attenborough Pancake Brunches", which consists of eating pancakes made prior and watching Planet Earth documentaries.

Eco House is located behind the Africana Studies and Research Center. The residential building has three floors with two wings each, except for the basement which has only one wing. Eco House was originally a hotel; consequently, each resident enjoys the luxury of his or her own bathroom, shared only with one's roommate. Residents are also permitted to keep small, containable pets. Eco House has four Residential Advisors (RAs) and one Residence Hall Director (RHD).

Before becoming Ecology House, the building was the Cornell Heights Residential Club, an off-campus residence for students in an experimental accelerated Ph.D. program, and the site of a 1967 fire that killed eight students and a professor.

North Campus Housing Cooperatives
Cornell-owned housing cooperatives in this campus area include Prospect of Whitby (228 Wait Avenue), Wari House, Triphammer Cooperative, 302 Wait Avenue, and 308 Wait Terrace. Students in cooperatives enjoy reduced housing costs while living in a community environment where they share household chores such as cleaning and cooking dinners for their residents. Student officers are appointed for each house, and active participation in household activities is encouraged.

North Campus Fraternities
 Acacia (fraternity), 318 Highland Road
 Alpha Epsilon Pi (fraternity), 140 Thurston Avenue
 Beta Theta Pi (fraternity), 100 Ridgewood Road
 Delta Chi (fraternity), 102 The Knoll
 Kappa Delta Rho (fraternity), 312 Highland Road
 Phi Delta Theta (fraternity), 2 Ridgewood Road 
 Phi Kappa Tau (fraternity), 106 The Knoll
 Pi Kappa Phi (fraternity), 55 Ridgewood Road
 Sigma Chi (fraternity), 106 Cayuga Heights Road
 Zeta Beta Tau (fraternity), 1 Edgecliff Place
 Zeta Psi (fraternity), 534 Thurston Avenue

References

External links
North Campus Residential Expansion at Cornell University website 

Cornell University buildings
Cornell University campuses
Cornell University dormitories